Black Belt is a 1984 video game published by Earthware Computer Services.

Gameplay
Black Belt is a game in which the record for a boxer improves and gains experience, and he becomes able to use more moves in a match.

Reception
Rick Teverbaugh reviewed the game for Computer Gaming World, and stated that "The graphics are fluid and well-drawn. It is quite easy to see what you're doing and its effect on the other combatant."

References

External links
Review in Tilt (French)
Entry in The Book of Apple Software

1984 video games
Apple II games
Commodore 64 games
Fighting games
Martial arts video games
Taekwondo
Video games developed in the United States